Pachi pulusu is an unheated version of the hot tamarind soup pulusu. It is mainly a summer dish in Andhra Pradesh and Telangana. Unlike regular pulusu, this kind is much more spicy, watery and light.

Preparation
Typically this dish is prepared with tamarind with onions, chillies, and jaggery. Other typical seasonings may be added, such as coriander, curry leaf, or garlic. In the summer when mangoes are abundant, tamarind is replaced by stewed raw mango.

References

Andhra cuisine